Agios Prokopios is a seaside village on the island of Naxos, Greece. It boasts magnificent beaches on the Aegean and is a favorite tourist attraction.

At the 2001 census it numbered 222 residents.

References

Populated places in Naxos (regional unit)